WCCY (1400 AM) is a radio station broadcasting a contemporary hit radio format. Licensed to Houghton, Michigan, it first began broadcasting in 1929. It is owned by the Houghton Community Broadcasting Corporation, a subsidiary of The Marks Group.

The studios are at 313 E. Montezuma, Houghton. It shares this location with its sister stations, WOLV and WHKB.

History
On June 16, 2017, at 3 pm, WCCY changed their format from adult standards to CHR, branded as "99.3 The Lift".

References

Michiguide.com - WCCY History

External links

CCY
Contemporary hit radio stations in the United States
Radio stations established in 1929
1929 establishments in Michigan